The 2002 Berlin Thunder season was the fourth season for the franchise in the NFL Europe League (NFLEL). The team was led by head coach Peter Vaas in his third year, and played its home games at Jahn-Sportpark in Berlin, Germany. They finished the regular season in second place with a record of six wins and four losses. In World Bowl X, Berlin defeated the Rhein Fire 26–20. The victory marked the franchise's second World Bowl championship.

Offseason

Free agent draft

Personnel

Staff

Roster

Standings

Game summaries

World Bowl X

References

Berlin
Berlin Thunder seasons